Victor Dolidze (born 4 July 1973) is a Georgian diplomat and politician. He was the State Minister of Georgia on European and Euro-Atlantic integration between 27 November 2016 and 22 December 2017.

Biography

Education 
Mr. Dolidze graduated from Tbilisi State University in 1995 and holds bachelor's degree in the International Law and International Relations. He completed several courses on Defense and Security Resources Management in 1997 at NATO Defense College (Rome, Italy), in 1998 Swedish National Defense College, in 1999 he studied at the Defense Resources Management Institute (Monterey, California, USA) and in 2004 George C. Marshall European Center of Security Studies (Garmisch, Germany).

Career
Between the years of 2012-2016 he was elected as a Member of the Parliament of Georgia. From 2012 till April 2015 Mr. Dolidze was the Chairman of the Committee on European Integration and from March 2015 Co-President of the Eastern Partnership, EURONEST Parliamentary Assembly. From 2010 to 2012 he was elected member of the fourth convocation of Tbilisi City Assembly.

From 2009 to 2016 Mr. Victor Dolidze was a member of the political team of Irakli Alasania, as well as one of the founders, and a board member of the political party "Free Democrats". From 2005 to 2009 he was the Ambassador Extraordinary and Plenipotentiary in the Republic of Austria and the Republic of Hungary and the permanent representative to OSCE and other International Organizations in Vienna (Austria).

During the professional career Mr. Viktor Dolidze was actively involved in the activities of the Security Committee of OSCE. In 2007 he led the directions of Police issues at the Security Committee. In August 2008 he actively presented the Interests of Georgia to OSCE and the number of Military Observers was increased in the conflict zone. While working to NATO he was a member of the Political, Military-Political, Scientific, Civil Defense Planning Committees and Economic Directorate.

Until 2005 for one year, Mr. Dolidze was the director of the International Security Department in National Security Council of Georgia. Between 2001-2004 he was the Counsellor in the Embassy of Georgia in the Kingdom of Belgium and the member of the Mission of Georgia to NATO.

In the late 1990s he was serving in the Ministry of Foreign Affairs of Georgia in the Military-Political Department as the Head of NATO Division and afterwards as the Head of Bilateral Relations Division. From 1996 to 1997 Mr. Victor Dolidze was on different positions at the Ministry of Foreign Affairs of Georgia.

References

1973 births
Government ministers of Georgia (country)
Diplomats from Tbilisi
Politicians from Tbilisi
Tbilisi State University alumni
Living people